"Kaze no La La La" (風のららら/La La La of the Wind) is Mai Kuraki's 17th single, released on May 28, 2003

Track listing

Usage in media
 "Detective Conan" anime series opening theme

Charts

Oricon Sales Chart

References

2003 singles
2003 songs
Mai Kuraki songs
Giza Studio singles
Case Closed songs
Songs written by Mai Kuraki
Songs written by Michiya Haruhata
Song recordings produced by Daiko Nagato